Bystrinsky District is an administrative and municipal district (raion) of Kamchatka Krai, Russia, one of the eleven in the krai. It is located in the southern central part of the krai. Its administrative center is the rural locality (a selo) of Esso. Population:  The population of Esso accounts for 78.6% of the district's total population.

Climate
Bystrinsky District has a subarctic climate (Köppen Dfc). Although the winters are not so cold as in interior Siberia, they are around  colder than on the Pacific coast of Kamchatka at the same latitude, so that discontinuous permafrost underlays the region. Precipitation, however, is much less than on the Pacific coast as the moist winds from the northern side of the Aleutian Low dry out before reaching the region.

Demographics
Ethnic composition (2010):
 Russians – 50.4%
 Evens – 34.5%
 Koryaks – 4.9%
 Ukrainians – 2.5%
 Itelmens – 2.4%
 Tatars – 1.4%
 Others – 3.9%

Sources

References

Notes

Districts of Kamchatka Krai